George Klosko (born 1950) is an American philosopher and Henry L. and Grace Doherty Professor at the University of Virginia. He is known for his works on contemporary political theory.

Klosko received his B.A. and Ph.D. from Columbia University.

Books
The Development of Plato’s Political Theory (Methuen, 1986; Second Edition, Oxford, 2006)
 The Principle of Fairness and Political Obligation (Rowman and Littlefield, 1992)
 Political Obligations (Oxford University Press, 2005)
 The Oxford Handbook of the History of Political Philosophy (Oxford, 2011)
 The Transformation of American Liberalism (Oxford University Press, 2017)
 Why we should obey the law? (Polity Press, 2019)

References

External links
Personal website

21st-century American philosophers
Philosophy academics
American political philosophers
University of Virginia faculty
1950 births
Living people
Columbia College (New York) alumni
Columbia Graduate School of Arts and Sciences alumni